John W. Bell (September 16, 1916 – June 1, 1982) was an American politician in the state of Florida.

Bell was born in New York and came to Florida in 1946. An attorney, he attended Columbia University and Columbia Law School. He served in the Florida State Senate from 1967 to 1971, as a member of the Republican Party (38th district). He also served in the Florida House of Representatives from 1963 to 1966.

References

Republican Party Florida state senators
Columbia Law School alumni
Politicians from New York City
20th-century American politicians
1916 births
1982 deaths